Iljimae (literally "One blossom branch") is a 2008 South Korean period-action television series, starring Lee Joon-gi in the title role of Iljimae. It is loosely based on the comic strip Iljimae, published between 1975 and 1977, written by Ko Woo-young based on Chinese folklore from the Ming dynasty about a masked Robin Hood-esque character during the Joseon era.

It was directed by Lee Yong-suk, and produced by Chorokbaem Media. It aired on SBS from May 21 to July 24, 2008 on Wednesdays and Thursdays at 21:55 (KST) for 20 episodes.

Synopsis
The story takes place in Joseon, around 1633. Lee Gyeom (Lee Joon-gi) is the son of the virtuous nobleman Lee Won-ho, who is the king's trustworthy supporter and brother, and a central member of the secret organization Cheonwoohoe, composed of other five important nobles with the king as their leader. When a blind fortune teller, looking at Lee Won-ho's home, refers to the king that he sees a person as bright as the sun who would be adored by the people, the king killed Lee Won-ho as he believed that 'two suns cannot exist on the same sky'. Gyeom, from the inside of a safe, manages to survive and witnesses the murder; later, when he is forced to throw a rock at his mother's head to prove that he isn't her son, he loses his memory for the shock and is adopted by a retired thief, Soe-dol, who renames him "Yong-i". Thirteen years later, Yong-i regains his memories and begins to search for his older sister Yeon, only to see her being sentenced and hanged.

The murder of his older sister leaves Gyeom seeking revenge and, with the emblem on the killer's sword he remembers from thirteen years ago as his only clue, he swears to avenge his family. To find the sword and its owner, he disguises himself as the mysterious, black-swathed thief Iljimae, who breaks into the nobles' estates the members of the secret organization, Cheonwoohoe. Meanwhile, he also helps the people with injustices, becoming a hero. At the scene of each robbery, he leaves a handkerchief portraying a branch of red plum blossoms, symbol of the house where he lived and of his childhood memories: the very name of Iljimae reflects this, as "il" means "one", "ji" means "branch" and "mae" means "plum tree". The king and the nobility try to catch Iljimae and find his identity, especially the guard Byeon Si-hoo, who sees this as an opportunity to redeem himself from his life of misery and become a noble. In the meantime, Yong-i falls in love with Eun-chae (Han Hyo-joo), daughter of nobleman Byeon Shik and Si-hoo's stepsister, who can't forget her first love Lee Gyeom.

Cast

Main
 Lee Joon-gi as Lee Gyeom / Yong-i / Iljimae
 Yeo Jin-goo as child Lee Gyeom
A no-good, lazy gangster by day, and a mysterious thief who protects the citizens in the dark.
 Park Si-hoo as Cha-dol / Byeon Si-hoo
 Lee David as child Cha-dol
Once a poor boy, he was told at the age of nine that his real father was magistrate Byeon Shik and was sent to live with him, becoming a royal guard. However, his real father is actually Lee Won-ho. His dream is to catch Iljimae so that he can finally become a nobleman.
 Han Hyo-joo as Byeon Eun-chae
 Kim Yoo-jung as child Byeon Eun-chae
A lovely and kind girl of noble birth who seems to be fated both for and against Gyeom.
 Lee Young-ah as Bong-soon
 Jung Da-bin as child Bong-soon
A funny, silly swindler who was orphaned as a girl and is connected to Gyeom's past.

Supporting
 Lee Moon-sik as Soe-dol, Yong-i's and Cha-dol's foster father
 Kim Sung-ryung as Dan-i, Cha-dol's mother, Yong-i's foster mother
 Lee Il-hwa as Mrs Han, Gyeom's mother
 Son Tae-young as Lee Yeon, Gyeom's sister
 Jo Min-ki as Lee Won-ho, Gyeom's and Cha-dol's father
 Jung In-seo as Sumsumyi	
 Ahn Gil-kang as Gong-gal, Bong-soon's foster father, ex-assassin
 Mun Ji-yun as Dae-shik, Yong-i's friend
 Kim Hyun-sung as Heung-gyeon, Yong-i's friend, shoemaker
 Jeong Jae-eun as Sim-deok, inn keeper
 Lee Won-jae as Jang Po-gyo, hunter
 Lee Won-jong as Byeon Shik, Eun-chae's and Si-wan's father, Si-hoo's foster (supposed real) father 
 Kim Mu-yeol as Byeon Si-wan, Eun-chae's older brother
 Yang Jae-sung as Shim Gi-won, Lee Won-ho's friend
 Kim Roi-ha as Sa-cheon, king's assassin
 Jo Sang-ki as Mu-i, king's assassin
 Seo Dong-won as Eun-bok, hunter's son
 Do Ki-seok as Hee-bong, gang leader
 Kim Kwan-sik as Geok-doo, Heung-gyeon's father
 Jang Eun-pung as Mak-soe
 Lee Seol-goo as Kang-woo
 Kim Chang-wan as King Injo
 Noh Young-hak as Bong-soon's older brother

Production
There have been several versions of this story, which first appeared in two Ming dynasty novels, including a 1994 Hong Kong film, a 2005 TVB series and a 2011 Chinese television series, called The Vigilantes in Masks.

MBC bought the rights to the comic strip for their adaptation, hence the SBS version features an original storyline. Lee is the second Korean actor to play the hero following Jang Dong-gun in 1993 and followed by Jung Il-woo for MBC's The Return of Iljimae in 2009.

Ratings

Awards and nominations

International broadcast
 So-net TV began broadcasting the series in Japan on 24 November 2008. Reruns aired on terrestrial channel TV Tokyo from 15 June to 24 August 2009, and Mnet Japan starting 25 August 2009.
 It aired in Thailand on Channel 3 from December 4, 2009 to February 19, 2010.
 It also aired in Nigeria on government owned ITN channel from 2016 year end.

References

External links
 Iljimae official SBS website 
 Iljimae Japanese website 
 
 

Seoul Broadcasting System television dramas
2008 South Korean television series debuts
2008 South Korean television series endings
Korean-language television shows
Television series set in the Joseon dynasty
South Korean action television series
South Korean historical television series
Television series by Chorokbaem Media
Martial arts television series